Neocerynea is a monotypic moth genus of the family Noctuidae erected by George Hampson in 1918. Its only species, Neocerynea sabulosa, was first described by Schaus in 1901. It is found in Mexico.

References

Acontiinae
Monotypic moth genera